Oksan Seowon may refer to;

Oksan Seowon, Gyeongju, Confucian academy and shrine in Gyeongju, South Korea
Oksan Seowon, Hadong
Oksan Seowon, Jeongeup